Istanbul Medeniyet University is a public university in Istanbul, Turkey. It was established on July 21, 2010. "Medeniyet" is the Turkish word for "civilization" or "culture".

Academics

Faculties
 Medicine
 Health sciences
 Engineering and Architecture
 Letters
 Political science
 Nature sciences
 Education science
Faculty of Law
 Aviation and Space science
 Art and Design
 Tourism

Colleges
 Languages
 Civil aviation

Institutes
 Health sciences
 Social sciences
 Nature sciences
 Educational sciences

References

External links
Official website

Educational institutions established in 2010
Istanbul Medeniyet University
State universities and colleges in Turkey
2010 establishments in Turkey